Swati Bajpai is an Indian television actress. She is best known for portraying Nimmi Kaushik in Mrs. Kaushik Ki Paanch Bahuein.

Career 
She was first seen in Imagine TV's popular dance class show Nachle Ve with Saroj Khan, hosted by popular Bollywood choreographer Saroj Khan, as one of Khan's students. She was also seen as a contestant in the matchmaking reality show Lux Perfect Bride in 2009. Bajpai then acted in Zee TV's daily soap Mrs. Kaushik Ki Paanch Bahuein for almost two years. She has done several TV ads and walked the ramp for more than two dozen fashion designers in a career spanning over 5 years.  According to some reports, she was also approached for Bigg Boss 7.

Television

References

External links
 Swati Bajpai on IMDb

Indian television actresses
Living people
Actresses from Mumbai
Year of birth missing (living people)
Actresses in Hindi television
21st-century Indian actresses